The men's lightweight event was part of the boxing programme at the 1932 Summer Olympics.  The weight class was the fourth-lightest contested, and allowed boxers of up to 135 pounds (61.2 kilograms). The competition was held from Tuesday, August 9, 1932 to Saturday, August 13, 1932. Thirteen boxers from 13 nations competed.

Medalists

Results

References

External links
Official Olympic Report
 

Lightweight